Tim Eliot, better known by his stage name Current Value, is a German drum & bass producer and DJ. Eliot began dabbling in electronic music in 1992, when he got a Casio keyboard for Christmas. Several years later he began receiving recognition on local Berlin radio stations. In 2004, after 1 year of education, he received his Diploma at the School of Audio Engineering (SAE).

In 2012, his remix of a track from Björk's album Biophilia, was included on Biophilia Remix Series I.

Discography

Albums 
Frequency Hunt (August 18, 1998)
Seeds Of Mutation (March 16, 1999)
In A Far Future (March 21, 2000)
Beyond Digits (August 2, 2002)
2012: The Day Of Silence (November 23, 2009)
Back To The Machine (August 23, 2010)
Revolt & Riot (July 4, 2011) (with Donny)
Quantum Physics (October 29, 2012)
Stay On This Planet (September 30, 2013)
Biocellulose (March 25, 2016)
Deadly Toys (December 21, 2017)
PUER (October 17, 2019)
SENEX (December 17, 2019)
The All Attracting (April 15, 2021)
Platinum Scatter (September 15, 2022)

EPs 
The Empowered Peace (November 11, 2008) [Tech Itch]
You Can't Play God (March 16, 2009) [Freak]
Crude Chronicles (March 5, 2012) [Subtrakt]
Megalomania (July 2, 2012) [Position Chrome]
So Loud (May 13, 2013) [Subtrakt]
Sonic Barrier (February 17, 2014) [The Sect Music]
Subs9.5 (May 5, 2014) [Subsistenz]
Critical Presents: Binary Vol. 4 (February 2, 2015) [Critical]
Nitro (February 15, 2015) [Blackout]
Force Black (May 25, 2015) [Bad Taste]
Rocket Science (September 25, 2015) [Blackout]
Partition (July 15, 2016) [Terminal]
Airshift (September 30, 2016) [Cyberfunk]
Rethink (October 31, 2016) [Othercide]
Critical Presents: Systems 006 (December 9, 2016) [Critical]
Starfleet (March 10, 2017) [Blackout]
Scalar (May 5, 2017) [31 Records]
Consequences (June 14, 2018) [MethLab]
City Syndrome (August 16, 2018) [Souped Up]
Searcher (February 1, 2019) [Invisible]
Far Layer (March 22, 2019) [Othercide]
Time Gap (July 6, 2020) [Blackout]
Runway (December 3, 2021) [Korsakov]

Singles 
"Skybreaker (Untitled 3) / T.S. Overdose (Untitled 4)" (1997, Position Chrome)
"Falling Into It / Subsonic" (1998, Don Q Records)
"Bassriot / Untitled Master" (1998, Position Chrome)
"Creative Robot / Solution" (1998, Position Chrome)
"The Edge of the Cliff / Dark Rain" (2006, Intransigent Recordings)
"Excellence / Twisted" (2006, Algorhythm Recordings)
"Full Spectrum Warrior / Strange Peace" (2006, Tech Itch Recordings)
"The Forbidden Room" (2007, Intransigent Recordings)
"Brainwash" (2007, Evol Intent)
"Tempest" (2008, L/B Recordings), with Limewax
"Agent of Evolution / Love All The People" (2009, Offkey Recordings), with Dying Punks
"Bravery / Echolot" (2009, Venom Inc)
"Polar Position" (2010, Subsistenz)
"Lipophil" (2010, Subsistenz)
"Shy Flame" (2011, Section 8 Records), with Snow
"Bruja" (2011, Barcode Recordings)
"Time of the Rain" (2011, Intransigent Recordings), with Snow
"Control / Birth Cycle" (2011, Forbidden Society Recordings), with Forbidden Society
"Obsessive" (2011, Counterstrike), with Counterstrike
"Impact" (2012, Subtrakt)
"Make It Last / Melo" (2012, Position Chrome), with The Panacea
"Hydrolic" (2013, The Sect Music)
"So Loud" (2013, Subtrakt)
"Ready for Apocalypse" (2014, OtherCide), with Homeboy
"Maintainer / Tremor" (2015, Yellow Stripe)
"Neuronord / Serial Fracture (2015, Yellow Stripe)
"Cotton Punch" (2015, Invisible Recordings)
"Jet Bike / Traktion" (2015, The Sect Music)
"Twilight State" (2015, Invisible Recordings)
"Get Down To It / Fake" (2015, Trendkill Records)
"Sleepwalk" (2017, Titan Records)
"Counter Mechanics / Signal Jam" (2018, Blackout Music)
"Portal Breach (with Abis) / No Halfsteppin'" (2019, Let It Roll)
"Overturn" (2020, Blackout Music)
"Cockpit" (2021, Souped Up Records)
"Atonement / Measures" (2022, DIVIDID)

References

External links 

Drum and bass musicians
German DJs
German electronic musicians
Electronic dance music DJs

Musicians from Berlin
Living people
Year of birth missing (living people)